Caviar, sometimes Kaviar is, primarily, the name given to the luxury delicacy consisting of processed, salted, non-fertilized sturgeon roe.

Caviar may also refer to:

Arts, entertainment, and media
Caviar (band), United States pop rock band
Caviar (album), their debut album
Caviar, an anthology of short stories by Theodore Sturgeon
Kaviar, the German coprophiliac genre of pornographic movie

Biology
Caviar lime, a nickname for the Australian finger lime plant Citrus australasica, which produces edible fruit 
Green caviar, green edible algae
Snail caviar, the eggs of edible land snails or escargot

Brands and enterprises
Caviar, a brand of consumer hard drives produced by Western Digital
Caviar, a third-party restaurant delivery company owned by DoorDash
Caviar, a company that sells luxury items

Utensils
Caviar spoon

Other uses
Black Caviar (horse), an Australian racehorse
Caviar tongue, condition characterized by purplish venous ectasias on the tongue
Gauche caviar, French political term meaning "Caviar left", i.e., a champagne socialist
Texas caviar, a salad of black-eyed peas lightly pickled in a vinaigrette-style dressing
Smörgåskaviar, a Swedish sandwich spread in the form of a paste made from cod roe